Fatih Yılmaz may refer to:

 Fatih Yılmaz (footballer, born 1989), Turkish football defensive midfielder
 Fatih Yılmaz (footballer, born 2002), Turkish football centre-back